Tinius Olsen (December 7, 1845 – October 20, 1932) was a Norwegian-born American engineer and inventor. He was the founder of the Tinius Olsen Material Testing Machine Company, a maker of material testing machines. He was awarded the Elliott Cresson Medal of The Franklin Institute in 1891 for his autographic testing machine.

Life and career
Tinius Olsen was born in Kongsberg, Norway. He was one of eight children. Olsen graduated from the  Horten Technical School (Horten tekniske skole) in 1866.

Employment and Immigration
Olsen first became the foreman of the machine department at a large naval machine shop. Olsen subsequently immigrated to the United States during 1869.

"Little Giant"
In 1880, he submitted a patent application for an improved testing machine and the patent was granted the same year, on June 1, 1880.

Later years
Olsen was awarded the Royal Norwegian Order of St. Olav in 1907. Olsen retired from the company in 1929 and died during 1932 in Philadelphia. Olsen remembered his origin with gifts to his home land including awards to Horten Technical School and  Kongsberg Church as well grants to a retirement home in  his wife's home town  of Helsingborg, Sweden.

Personal life
In 1874, Olsen married Swedish-born physician, Amalie Charlotte Yhlen  (1839–1920). Olsen died during 1932 and his wife during 1920. Both   were buried at West Laurel Hill Cemetery in Montgomery County, Pennsylvania. They were the parents of Thorsten Yhlen Olsen (1879- 1957) who succeeded his father  as president of the firm.

Selected list of patents
Improvement In Testing Machines – United States Patent # 213,586. Issue date: Mar 1879
Testing Machine – United States Patent # 228,214. Issue Date: June 1, 1880
Recording Testing-Machine – United States Patent # 445,476. Issue date: Jan 27, 1891

Tinius Olsen's School
The Tinius Olsen's School (Fagskolen Tinius Olsen) is a combined technical vocational college and secondary school in Kongsberg.

References

Other sources
 Lovoll, Odd Sverre  (1999) The Promise of America (Minneapolis, MN: University of Minnesota Press)
 Bjork, Kenneth  (1947)  Saga in Steel and Concrete Norwegian Engineers in America (Northfield, MN: Norwegian-American Historical Association)
Tatnall, Francis G. (1925) Evolution of the Testing Machine (Philadelphia: Riehl Brothers Testing Machine Co.)

External links
Abstract of Tinius Olsen Testing Machine
Tinius Olsen Material Testing Machine Company
Fagskolen Tinius Olsen.  Kongsberg, Norway Norwegian

1845 births
1932 deaths
People from Kongsberg
People from Philadelphia
Norwegian engineers
20th-century Norwegian inventors
American civil engineers
20th-century American inventors
Norwegian emigrants to the United States
Recipients of the St. Olav's Medal
Engineers from Pennsylvania